James S. Kavourias (born October 4, 1979 in Brooklyn, Ohio, United States) is a former professional baseball outfielder. Kavourias played in the Florida Marlins minor league system from 2000 to 2004.  He participated in the 2004 Olympics, as a member of Greece's baseball team.

External links

1979 births
People from Brooklyn, Ohio
American people of Greek descent
Baseball players from Ohio
Baseball players at the 2004 Summer Olympics
Olympic baseball players of Greece
Greek baseball players
Living people
Utica Blue Sox players
Kane County Cougars players
Jupiter Hammerheads players
Carolina Mudcats players
Joliet JackHammers players